Nebulosa is a genus of moths of the family Notodontidae. It consists of the following species:
Nebulosa albitumida  (Dognin, 1902) 
Nebulosa aliena  (Dognin, 1904) 
Nebulosa bialbifera  (Warren, 1904) 
Nebulosa cistrina  (Druce, 1899) 
Nebulosa cistrinoides  (Dognin, 1909) 
Nebulosa cletor  (Druce, 1893) 
Nebulosa creon  (Druce, 1885) 
Nebulosa crypsispila  (Warren, 1901) 
Nebulosa delicata  Miller, 2008
Nebulosa elicioi  Miller, 2008
Nebulosa erymas  (Druce, 1885) 
Nebulosa fulvipalpis  (Dognin, 1910) 
Nebulosa grimaldii  Miller, 2008
Nebulosa halesius  (Druce, 1885) 
Nebulosa hermani  Miller, 2008
Nebulosa huacamayensis  Miller, 2008
Nebulosa inaequiplaga  (Dognin, 1911) 
Nebulosa latialbata  (Prout, 1918) 
Nebulosa mirma  (Druce, 1899) 
Nebulosa nasor  (Druce, 1899) 
Nebulosa nervosa  (Edwards, 1884) 
Nebulosa ocellata  Miller, 2008
Nebulosa plataea  (Druce, 1893) 
Nebulosa rabae  Miller, 2008
Nebulosa rawlinsi  Miller, 2008
Nebulosa rudicula  Miller, 2008
Nebulosa sirenia  (Hering, 1925) 
Nebulosa thanatos  (Hering, 1925) 
Nebulosa tiznon  (Dognin, 1899) 
Nebulosa yanayacu  Miller, 2008

Notodontidae of South America